Tennard v. Dretke, 542 U.S. 274 (2004), was a United States Supreme Court case in which the court was asked whether evidence of the defendant's low IQ  in a death penalty trial had been adequately presented to the jury for full consideration in the penalty phase of his trial. The Supreme Court held that not considering a defendant's low IQ would breach his Eighth Amendment rights and constitute a cruel and unusual punishment.

Facts of the case
Robert Tennard  was convicted of capital murder by a Texas jury.  Tennard and two accomplices robbed and killed two neighbors.  The evidence presented at trial indicated that Tennard killed one of the victims by stabbing while his accomplice used a hatchet to kill the other victim. In the evidence phase of the trial, the defense presented evidence that Tennard's IQ was 67, a fact which the prosecution did not dispute. The prosecutors argued that Tennard's IQ was irrelevant to the case.
The jury was instructed to evaluate two issues: did the defendant deliberately commit the crime, and was the defendant likely to be dangerous in the future? The jury answered yes to both questions and sentenced Tennard to death.

The defense then argued that the jury instructions in the penalty phase were inadequate, and Tennard's death penalty was in violation of the cruel and unusual punishment clause of the Eighth Amendment.

Questions at issue
The District Court for the Southern District of Texas denied Tennard a certificate to appeal on the basis that a low IQ is not a sufficient reason for appeal there was no evidence presented that Tennard's behavior was mentally retarded and that mental retardation was related to the criminal act. The Fifth Circuit Court of Appeals upheld this finding. The Supreme Court granted Tennard's writ of certiorari.

Issue
The U.S. Supreme Court then vacated the decision and remanded it back to the Fifth Circuit for reconsideration in light of the court's contemporaneous decision in Atkins v. Virginia. The Fifth Circuit considered and rejected the Atkins claim. Tennard appealed again.

The main issue the U.S Supreme Court considered was whether the Fifth Circuit improperly denied Mr. Tennard's certificate of appeal since he had presented substantial evidence of a violation of his constitutional rights, or had "demonstrated that reasonable jurists would find the district court's assessment of the constitutional claims debatable or wrong?" (quotation in original).

Outcome
The Supreme Court held that all relevant mitigating factors must be considered in the penalty phase of a death penalty case. It is not sufficient to allow the defendant to present mitigating factors during the trial if those factors are not considered in the sentencing. If the jury is not instructed to consider  all relevant mitigating factors, the defendant's Eighth Amendment rights are violated as failure to do so constitutes cruel and unusual punishment. The court concluded that Tennard's IQ was a relevant mitigating factor, and that the sentencing jury should have been made to consider it for the purposes of mitigation.

Ultimately, Tennard's death sentence was reduced to life in prison.

Significance
The case formed part of a series of decisions in which the Supreme Court adjusted and refined the capital sentencing methods of the various states.

See also
List of United States Supreme Court cases, volume 542
List of United States Supreme Court cases

Footnotes

External links
 
  Smith v. Dretke, Tennard v. Dretke (Consolidated)
 Robert James Tennard v. Douglas Dretke
 Petitioner's brief
 Respondent's brief

Capital punishment in Texas
Cruel and Unusual Punishment Clause and death penalty case law
United States Supreme Court cases
United States Supreme Court cases of the Rehnquist Court
2004 in United States case law